Elah ( ’Ēlā;) was the fourth king of Israel, the son and successor of Baasha. William F. Albright has dated his reign to 877–876 BCE, while E. R. Thiele offers the dates 886–885 BCE. 

Chapter 16 of 1 Kings relates how Elah and all his family members were murdered by his chariot commander Zimri, who became his successor.

References

External links
 1 Kings Chapter 16
 "Elah", Jewish encyclopedia

880s BC deaths
9th-century BC Kings of Israel
9th-century BC murdered monarchs
Biblical murder victims
House of Baasha
Dethroned monarchs
Male murder victims